European Society for Mathematics and the Arts (ESMA) is a European society to promoting mathematics and the arts. The first Conference of ESMA, took place in July 2010 at the Institute Henri Poincaré in Paris.

References

External links
 The ESMA website

Mathematical societies
Mathematics and art